Peter Löwenbräu Griffin Sr. (born Justin Peter Griffin) is a fictional character and the main protagonist of the American animated sitcom Family Guy. He is voiced by the series' creator, Seth MacFarlane, and first appeared on television, along with the rest of the Griffin family, in the 15-minute pilot pitch of Family Guy on December 20, 1998. Peter was created and designed by MacFarlane himself. MacFarlane was asked to pitch a pilot to the Fox Broadcasting Company based on Larry & Steve, a short made by MacFarlane which featured a middle-aged character named Larry and an intellectual dog, Steve. After the series pilot was given the green light, the Griffin family appeared in the episode "Death Has a Shadow".

Peter is married to Lois and is the father of Meg, Chris, and Stewie. He also has a dog named Brian, with whom he is best friends. He has worked at a toy factory and at Quahog's Brewery. Peter's voice was inspired by the security guards that MacFarlane heard at his school. His appearance was a redesign of the protagonist Larry from MacFarlane's previous animated short films The Life of Larry and Larry & Steve. He has appeared in several pieces of Family Guy merchandise, including toys, T-shirts, and video games, and he has made crossover appearances in other shows, including The Simpsons, Drawn Together, American Dad!, and Family Guys spin-off series The Cleveland Show.

Role in Family Guy 
Peter Griffin is a middle-class Irish American in his mid 40s, who is a bespectacled, obese blue-collar worker with a prominent Rhode Island and Eastern Massachusetts accent. Peter's age has never been officially confirmed and has fluctuated. Peter and his wife Lois have three children: Meg, Chris, and Stewie. He also has two deceased children, Peter Jr. who was shaken to death, and Dave, Stewie's twin who is implied to have been killed by Stewie during childbirth. He is the illegitimate son of Thelma Griffin and Mickey McFinnigan, and was raised by Thelma and his stepfather Francis Griffin. It's uncertain if Peter's legal parents were married before he was conceived, however, as Peter has a flashback in which Francis directly tells him, "I'm not your father!" in the episode "Peter's Two Dads" in which Peter realizes that Francis isn't his true father, implying he knew that Peter isn't his biological son. Peter and his family live in the fictional town of Quahog, Rhode Island, which is modeled after Providence, Rhode Island. Peter primarily worked as a safety inspector at the Happy-Go-Lucky Toy Factory until his boss Jonathan Weed choked to death on a dinner roll while dining with Peter and Lois; he then became a fisherman on his own boat, which was known as the "S.S. More Powerful than Superman, Batman, Spider-Man, and The Incredible Hulk Put Together", with the help of two Portuguese immigrants, Santos and Pasqual, until his boat was destroyed. He now works in the shipping department of the Pawtucket Patriot brewery. Peter is also shown in various jobs for single episodes and cutaway gags. In one episode, Peter played for the NFL's New England Patriots until his behavior resulted in him being kicked off the team. In a running gag, storylines are randomly interrupted by extremely long, unexpected fights between Peter and Ernie the Giant Chicken, an anthropomorphic chicken who serves as an archenemy to Peter. These battles parody the action film genre, with explosions, high-speed chases, and immense devastation to the town of Quahog.

Character

Creation 
MacFarlane initially conceived Family Guy in 1995 while studying animation at the Rhode Island School of Design (RISD). During college, he created his thesis film entitled The Life of Larry, which was submitted by his professor at RISD to Hanna-Barbera. MacFarlane was hired by the company. Then in 1996, MacFarlane created a sequel to The Life of Larry entitled Larry & Steve, which featured a middle-aged character named Larry and an intellectual dog, Steve; the short was broadcast in 1997 as one of Cartoon Network's World Premiere Toons. Executives at Fox saw the Larry shorts and contracted MacFarlane to create a series, entitled Family Guy, based on the characters. Fox proposed MacFarlane complete a 15-minute short, and gave him a budget of $50,000. Several aspects of Family Guy were inspired by the Larry shorts. While working on the series, the characters of Larry and his dog Steve slowly evolved into Peter and Brian. MacFarlane stated that the difference between The Life of Larry and Family Guy was that "Life of Larry was shown primarily in my dorm room and Family Guy was shown after the Super Bowl."

Voice 

The voice of Peter is provided by MacFarlane, who also provides the voice for Brian, Stewie, Quagmire, Tom Tucker, Carter Pewterschmidt, and Dr. Hartman, and others. MacFarlane has been part of the main voice cast from the beginning of the series including the pilot, and has voiced Peter from the start. MacFarlane chose to voice Peter and several other characters himself, believing it would be easier to portray the voices he already envisioned than for someone else to attempt it. MacFarlane's speaking voice is not very close to Peter's; he uses his normal voice as the voice of Brian. MacFarlane drew inspiration for the voice of Peter from the security guards he overheard talking while he was attending the Rhode Island School of Design; according to him, "I knew a thousand Peter Griffins growing up in New England. Guys who would not think before they spoke, like [switching to Peter's voice] there was no self-editing mechanism. [Pointing to himself] Everything in here, [pointing to his front] it's coming out here, with no gateway". MacFarlane also voices many of Peter's ancestors who share the same type of voice. He noted in an interview that he voices Peter and the rest of the characters partly because they initially had a small budget, but also that he prefers to have the freedom to do it himself. In another interview, he pointed out that Peter's voice is one of the most difficult to do.

There have been rare occasions where MacFarlane does not voice Peter. In the episode "No Meals on Wheels" (season 5, 2007), actor Patrick Stewart voiced Peter in a cutscene, but MacFarlane voices Peter for the rest of the episode. In the episode "Family Gay" (season 7, 2009), Seth Rogen provided a guest-voice as Peter under the effects of the "Seth Rogen gene". In "Road to the Multiverse" (season 8, 2009), he was voiced by actor Jamison Yang, who was required for a scene where everything in the world was Japanese. In Friends of Peter G (season 9, 2011), John Viener voiced Peter in an alternate timeline where he gave up drinking.

Personality 
Peter Griffin is a stereotypical blue-collar worker who frequently gets drunk with his neighbors and friends Cleveland Brown, Joe Swanson and Glenn Quagmire at "The Drunken Clam," Quahog's local tavern. In the season 4 episode "Petarded", Peter discovered his low intellect falls slightly below the level for mental retardation after taking an I.Q. test, which places his I.Q. at around 70. In that same episode, Peter is declared mentally retarded because of his low I.Q. level. Peter also might have brain damage in Wernicke’s area as he cutaways into seemingly random situations and speaks in perfect grammar but can’t seem to choose how to create a sentence. Peter is known for his brash impulsiveness, which has led to several awkward situations, such as attempting to molest Meg in order to adopt a redneck lifestyle. He is easily influenced by anyone he finds interesting and will often try to replicate their lifestyle and behavior merely out of curiosity. He is incredibly jealous of other attractions Lois has in her life, an attitude which has led to extreme situations, such as when he assaulted a whale that kissed Lois at SeaWorld. In the third season episode "Stuck Together, Torn Apart", Peter and Lois split up because of Peter's jealousy, only to discover that Lois has the same character flaw and the two decide to live together with their mutually jealous nature. Peter has a very short attention span which frequently leads him to bizarre situations, as Chris points out in "Long John Peter", after Peter's parrot dies "He will get over it pretty quickly and then move on to another wacky thing", to which Peter finds a pipe organ and forgets about his parrot (Peter then destroys the pipe organ within seconds and then finds a deed to a cattle ranch).  Peter is also naïve with one example in "Airport '07" where he thinks his truck will fly by filling it with airplane fuel.

Peter has complex relationships with all three of his children. He normally makes fun of Meg and treats her badly, such as in the episode "FOX-y Lady", where he, Meg and Chris try to create a cartoon and they exclude Meg and her ideas. Though in some episodes Peter has had a good relationship with Meg, in "Hell Comes to Quahog" (season 5, 2006), Peter almost tells Meg he loves her and in "Road to Rupert" (season 5, 2007), he told Meg that he would treat her badly in front of the family, but that he would be her friend in secret. It was presumed though that in "Peter's Sister", (season 14, 2015) that Peter would stop bullying Meg. Peter has a much better relationship with Stewie. Peter and Stewie had their adventures when he took him to Walt Disney World Resort in the episode "The Courtship of Stewie's Father" (season 4, 2005). With Chris, Peter communicates well, but at times when in need of advice or in an adventure Peter tells Chris to do the opposite of what he should do, like in "Long John Peter" (season 6, 2008), where Chris is asking for advice on dating and Peter tells him to treat women horribly.

Peter is best friends with his anthropomorphic dog, Brian. In earlier seasons, Brian often served as a voice of reason for Peter, helping him out with issues. Brian is extremely grateful to Peter for picking him up on the side of the road as a stray, shown during a flashback in the episode, "Brian: Portrait of a Dog". His gratitude was affirmed in "New Kidney in Town", where Brian offers to give up both his kidneys and his life so that Peter could undergo a kidney transplant, although he did not have to do it thanks to another, more suitable donor being found. At Brian's funeral in "Life of Brian", Peter said that Brian was his "best friend in the whole world" and "like a brother to him".

Ancestry 

Before Peter was born, his mother Thelma went to Mexico City to have an abortion but gave birth during the procedure, and smuggled him home to Providence, Rhode Island, where he spent his childhood. Peter was raised by Francis and Thelma Griffin in the Roman Catholic faith. In "Peter's Two Dads", he discovers that his biological father is an Irishman named Mickey McFinnigan. Peter visits Mickey, who initially rejects him. Mickey later accepts him as his son after beating him in the "game of drink" (the game of drink referring to matching shots until one passes out). Mickey is based on the friends of MacFarlane's father. MacFarlane said: "When I was growing up, my father had lots of friends: big, vocal, opinionated New England, Irish Catholics. They were all bursting at the seams with personality, and Family Guy came out of a lot of those archetypes that I spent years observing."

Reception

Praise 

Editors of Variety put Family Guy in their contenders for the 2011 Primetime Emmy Award for Outstanding Comedy Series; they stated that, depending on your sense of humor, Peter is either "a comedy genius" or "an obnoxious idiot". MacFarlane has been nominated for a Primetime Emmy Award in the Outstanding Voice-Over Performance category several times for voicing Peter and other characters; he won in 2016. He was also nominated in 2008 for an Annie Award in the Voice Acting in an Animated Television Production or Short Form for voicing Peter.

Peter has ranked in several of IGN's top 10s (generally these lists are related to the show). Among these, Peter ranked the third spot on IGN's "Top 25 Family Guy Characters," in which it was stated that many of the show's best gags come from Peter and his shenanigans and that "Peter practically invented the "manatee joke". Entertainment Weekly placed Peter in its "18 Bad TV Dads" list (the list also included characters like Homer Simpson and Al Bundy).

Criticism and controversy 
Peter has been criticized for being too similar to Homer Simpson. Peter has appeared in some episodes of The Simpsons; in these episodes which he has been featured, he has been depicted as Homer Simpson's clone or is accused of plagiarism. Ken Tucker of Entertainment Weekly wrote that Peter is Homer Simpson "as conceived by a singularly sophomoric mind that lacks any reference point beyond other TV shows". Robin Pierson from The TV Critic criticized the Griffin family for being too similar to the Simpson family, and said that Peter "has Homer Simpson written all over him". This is eventually made fun of in the episode "Ratings Guy" when, after Peter ruins television and goes to the networks to reverse the changes, Homer Simpson shows up with the same plight, with Peter going "A-ha! Looks like this is one we beat you to!" In "The Simpsons Guy", a crossover episode between Family Guy and The Simpsons, the Griffins end up in the town of Springfield after their car is stolen, where they meet the Simpsons.

Peter has created some controversy in various episodes of Family Guy. The episode "The Cleveland–Loretta Quagmire" (season 4, 2005) featured a sequence titled "You Have AIDS", in which Peter dances and sings in a barbershop quartet fashion around the bed of a man with end-stage AIDS about his diagnosis, which drew protests from several AIDS service organizations. In the episode "When You Wish Upon a Weinstein" (season 3, 2003), Peter sings a parody song of "When You Wish upon a Star", entitled "I Need a Jew"; on October 3, 2007, Bourne Co. Music Publishers filed a lawsuit accusing the show of infringing its copyright on the original song; Bourne Co., the sole United States copyright owner of the song, alleged the parody pairs a "thinly veiled" copy of their music with antisemitic lyrics. The complaint was not upheld.

Cultural influence

Appearances in the media 
Peter has made several television appearances outside of Family Guy, often in the form of direct parody. Peter has appeared in two episodes of The Simpsons, poking fun at how the two shows are frequently compared to each other. In the fourteenth season episode "Treehouse of Horror XIII", Peter is depicted as one of Homer Simpson's clones, and in the seventeenth season episode, "The Italian Bob", a photo of Peter is in a book of criminals, which says he is wanted for "plagiarismo". Peter also appeared in various episodes of the show's spin-off The Cleveland Show. In addition, Peter has appeared at the end of the American Dad! episode "Hurricane!" with guns on both Stan Smith and former neighbor Cleveland Brown. During the stand-off, Stan accidentally shoots his wife Francine, which Peter declares as "classic American Dad!".

Merchandise 
Peter is also featured on the Family Guy: Live in Vegas CD, and plays a significant part in Family Guy Video Game!, the first Family Guy video game, which was released by 2K Games in 2006. Peter was used in the game Family Guy Online as a character class for the game's character creator. MacFarlane recorded exclusive material of Peter's voice and other Family Guy characters for a 2007 pinball machine based the show, created by Stern Pinball. In 2004, the first series of Family Guy toy figurines was released by Mezco Toyz; each member of the Griffin family had their own toy, with the exception of Stewie, of whom two different figures were made. Over the course of two years, four more series of toy figures have been released, with various forms of Peter. Alongside the action figures, Peter has been included in various other Family Guy-related merchandise.

As of 2009, six books have been released about the Family Guy universe, all published by HarperCollins since 2005. This include Family Guy: It Takes a Village Idiot, and I Married One, which covers the entire events of the episode "It Takes a Village Idiot, and I Married One", and Family Guy and Philosophy: A Cure for the Petarded, a collection of 17 essays exploring the connections between the series and historical philosophers. which include Peter as a character. Peter appears in comic-book based on the Family Guy universe; by Titan Comics. The first comic book was released July 27, 2011.

In 2008, the character appeared in advertisements for Subway, promoting the restaurant's massive feast sandwich. Chief marketing officer Tony Pace commented "Peter's a good representation of the people who are interested in the Feast, and Family Guy is a show "that appeals to that target audience." The Boston Globe critic Brian Steinberg praised the restaurant's use of the character for the commercials.

Notes

References

External links 
 

Family Guy characters
Fictional factory workers
Fictional alcohol abusers
Fictional bullies
Fictional characters who break the fourth wall
Fictional child abusers
Fictional victims of sexual assault
Television characters introduced in 1999
Animated characters introduced in 1999
Fictional characters from Rhode Island
Fictional Irish American people
Animated human characters
Male characters in animated series
Characters created by Seth MacFarlane